Ardgroom is a village on the Beara peninsula in County Cork, Ireland. Its name refers to two gravelly hills deposited by a glacier, Dromárd and Drombeg. It lies to the north north west of Glenbeg Lough, overlooking the Kenmare River estuary. It sits between the coast and the Slieve Miskish Mountains. The village contains a shop, post office, a petrol station and "The Village Inn" pub.

Stone circle
Near the village lie a number of megalithic monuments. Signposted is the stone circle to be found to the east of the village at a distance of about 1 mile, off the old Kenmare road. It has the name "Canfea" but is normally called the "Ardgroom" stone circle. About 1 mile north east lie the remains of another stone circle.

The circle consists of 11 stones, 9 of which are still upright with one alignment stone outside the circle. Unusually for a stone circle, its stones tend to taper toward points.

Also in the vicinity are the remains of at least two ring forts and a number of standing stones and stone rows.

References

Stone circles in Ireland
Beara peninsula
Towns and villages in County Cork
Archaeological sites in County Cork